Zindanlu (also Romanized as Zīndānlū and Zenīdānlū; also known as Zeyvānlū) is a village in Jirestan Rural District, Sarhad District, Shirvan County, North Khorasan Province, Iran. At the 2006 census, its population was 131, in 30 families.

References 

Populated places in Shirvan County